Elham Hamidi (also Romanized as "Elhām Hamīdī"; born November 29, 1977) is an Iranian actress. She has appeared in the mini-series Prophet Joseph as Asinaat. She also starred in The Kingdom of Solomon as Mariyam.

Early life

Elham Hamidi is an accounting graduate student from "Roudehen University". She has two elder brothers, and she is married. Elham participated in school plays from the age of seven because it was her family occupation. Her father was also an actor and he was much active in theater, this developed an interest in Elham to join this field like her father. Elham is well known for her series "Pervaneh", "Musafir az Hind" (Passenger from India), Prophet Joseph, and The Kingdom of Solomon. Elham won the best actress award for her performance in "Kheili dour, Kheili Nazdik" ( So close, so far).

Filmography

Marriage 

She married Alireza Sadeghi in February 2019.

References

External links

1977 births
Living people
People from Tehran
Actresses from Tehran
Iranian film actresses
Iranian television actresses